Pamela Joan "Pam" Kurrell (born January 6, 1939) is a retired American discus thrower. She competed at 1956 and 1960 Summer Olympics and finished 18–19th. At the Pan American Games she won a silver medal in 1959, placing eighth in 1955.

References

American female discus throwers
1939 births
Living people
Track and field athletes from San Francisco
Olympic track and field athletes of the United States
Athletes (track and field) at the 1956 Summer Olympics
Athletes (track and field) at the 1960 Summer Olympics
Athletes (track and field) at the 1955 Pan American Games
Athletes (track and field) at the 1959 Pan American Games
Pan American Games silver medalists for the United States
Pan American Games medalists in athletics (track and field)
Medalists at the 1959 Pan American Games
21st-century American women